The China Association for Promoting Democracy is one of the eight legally recognized minor political parties in the People's Republic of China under the direction of the Chinese Communist Party. The party is a member of the Chinese People's Political Consultative Conference. It was formed on 30 December 1945, and mainly represents high-level intellectuals engaged in education and cultural publishing media. It holds seats in the National People's Congress of China.

Chairpersons 
 Ma Xulun (1949–1958)
 Zhou Jianren (1979–1984)
 Ye Shengtao (1984–1987)
 Lei Jieqiong (1987–1997)
 Xu Jialu (1997–2007)
 Yan Junqi (2007–2017)
 Cai Dafeng (2017–present)

References

External links 
 

 
1945 establishments in China
Organizations associated with the Chinese Communist Party
Political parties established in 1945
Progressive parties
Social democratic parties in Asia
Socialist parties in China